Margaret E. (Marge) Hollibaugh (1921–1997) was a Canada-based feminist involved in the Abortion Caravan and an author. Marge was married to Ace Hollibaugh, a student leader who had a passion for playing guitar. Marge and Ace had a daughter.

Hollibaugh was a member of "The Corrective Collective", a writing group which published She named it Canada because That's What It Was Called, and Neverdone: three centuries of women's work in Canada. She was a founding member of Vancouver Women's Caucus; a lifetime board member of the Anne Davis Transition House; an active participant in 'On To Ottawa Campaign' of 1970–71; and a supporting member of LEAF.  She died of a stroke on 21 August 1997 at Chilliwack General Hospital, Chilliwack, British Columbia, Canada.

References 

1920s births
1997 deaths
Canadian feminists